José Moreno Tallada (born 1952) was a Spanish international tennis player in the 1970s.

In 1973 at Wimbledon he defeated Mike Collins in three straight sets, but lost to Germany's Jürgen Fassbender.  In 1977 at the French Open, he was defeated by South Africa's John Yuill.  The following year at the French Open he was defeated by George Hardie.

Notes

Spanish male tennis players
1952 births
Living people